Westhope is a notable building in Tulsa, Oklahoma, USA.

Westhope may also refer to:
Westhope, Herefordshire, England
Westhope, North Dakota, USA
Westhope, Shropshire, England